Ken McKenzie (1923–2003) was a Canadian newspaper publisher and sports journalist.

Ken McKenzie or Ken MacKenzie may also refer to:
 Ken MacKenzie (baseball) (born 1934), Canadian Major League Baseball pitcher
 Ken MacKenzie (businessman) (born 1964), Canadian-born businessman and Chairman of BHP
 Ken McKenzie (footballer, born 1865) (1865–1917), Australian rules footballer for Port Adelaide
 Ken McKenzie (footballer, born 1887) (1887–1958), Australian rules footballer for St Kilda
 Ken McKenzie (rugby league) (1926–1998), Australian rugby league player

See also 
 Kenneth Mackenzie (disambiguation)